Soimah Pancawati (born September 29, 1980) is an Indonesian comedian, singer, pesindhèn, and presenter from Yogyakarta, Indonesia. She sings in several genres, including campursari, pesindhèn, ketoprak, Java pop, hip-hop, and dagelan. She grew up in a coast village at Tayu, Pati, Central Java.

Career
After graduation from junior high school, Soimah decided to continue her education at SMKI (Indonesian Musical High School). She won several singing competitions, including Bintang Karaoke Dangdut in Central Java-Yogyakarta, Bintang Televisi, and Dara Ayu.

She joined the group Jogja Hip Hop Foundation as a pesindhèn singer, and has appeared as a singer on the ANTV television show Seger. On January 9, 2012, she joined the talk show @Show_Imah. She has also appeared on Indonesia Mencari Bakat, Comedy Project, D'academy Asia 2 and Opera Van Java.

Personal life
Soimah Pancawati was born on September 29, 1980, in Pati, Central Java. She is the fifth of seven children of Hadinarko and Kasmiyati. She married Herwan Prandoko (also known as Koko) on December 27, 2002, and they have two sons.

Discography

Single

Filmography

Television

Awards and nominations

References

External links
 Biodata Soimah di Wow Keren

1980 births
Living people
People from Yogyakarta
21st-century Indonesian women singers
Javanese people
Muslim female comedians
Indonesian women television presenters